The 2016–17 Finnish Cup (Suomen Cup) was the 62nd season of the Finnish Cup. It was the first edition of the tournament to be played on a fall-spring schedule, running from July to September of the following year. The introduction of this new competition format meant that the Finnish League Cup was discontinued.

Teams

First round 

!colspan="3" align="center"|29 July 2016

|-
!colspan="3" align="center"|1 August 2016

|-
!colspan="3" align="center"|2 August 2016

|-
!colspan="3" align="center"|7 August 2016

|}

Second round 

!colspan="3" align="center"|

|-
!colspan="3" align="center"|27 July 2016

|-
!colspan="3" align="center"|7 August 2016

|-
!colspan="3" align="center"|8 August 2016

|-
!colspan="3" align="center"|9 August 2016

|-
!colspan="3" align="center"|10 August 2016

|-
!colspan="3" align="center"|11 August 2016

|-
!colspan="3" align="center"|13 August 2016

|-
!colspan="3" align="center"|16 August 2016

|-
!colspan="3" align="center"|17 August 2016

|-
!colspan="3" align="center"|19 August 2016

|-
!colspan="3" align="center"|20 August 2016

|-
!colspan="3" align="center"|21 August 2016

|-
!colspan="3" align="center"|22 August 2016

|-
!colspan="3" align="center"|23 August 2016

|-
!colspan="3" align="center"|24 August 2016

|-
!colspan="3" align="center"|25 August 2016

|-
!colspan="3" align="center"|27 August 2016

|-
!colspan="3" align="center"|28 August 2016

|-
!colspan="3" align="center"|29 August 2016

|-
!colspan="3" align="center"|30 August 2016

|}

Third round

!colspan="3" align="center"|

|-
!colspan="3" align="center"|7 September 2016

|-
!colspan="3" align="center"|10 September 2016

|-
!colspan="3" align="center"|11 September 2016

|-
!colspan="3" align="center"|13 September 2016

|-
!colspan="3" align="center"|14 September 2016

|-
!colspan="3" align="center"|19 September 2016

|-
!colspan="3" align="center"|28 September 2016

|-
!colspan="3" align="center"|29 September 2016

|-
!colspan="3" align="center"|2 October 2016

|}

Fourth round

!colspan="3" align="center"|7 October 2016

|-
!colspan="3" align="center"|8 October 2016

|-
!colspan="3" align="center"|11 October 2016

|-
!colspan="3" align="center"|12 October 2016

|-
!colspan="3" align="center"|13 October 2016

|-
!colspan="3" align="center"|15 October 2016

|}

Fifth round

!colspan="3" align="center"|20 October 2016

|-
!colspan="3" align="center"|21 October 2016

|-
!colspan="3" align="center"|22 October 2016

|-
!colspan="3" align="center"|23 October 2016

|}

Sixth round

Group stage

Group A

Group B

Group C

Group D

Group E

Play-offs for Quarterfinals

Quarter-finals

Semi-finals

Final

References

Cup 2016-17
Cup 2016-17
2016-17
Finland